Derek Thorn (born April 25, 1986) is an American professional stock car racing driver. He currently competes full-time in the SRL Southwest Tour. He won the championship in the NASCAR K&N Pro Series West with Sunrise Ford Racing in 2013 and again in 2018 in a one-off season with SFR. In 2022, Thorn won the 55th Annual Snowball Derby.

Motorsports career results

NASCAR 
(key) (Bold – Pole position awarded by qualifying time. Italics – Pole position earned by points standings or practice time. * – Most laps led. ** – All laps led.)

Nationwide Series

K&N Pro Series East

K&N Pro Series West

References

External links
 

1986 births
Living people
NASCAR drivers
Racing drivers from California